Pastra Glacier is a 4.8 km long and 2 km wide glacier in the central part of Trinity Island in the Palmer Archipelago, Antarctica.  Draining northwards to flow into Milburn Bay.

The glacier is named after the settlement of Pastra in western Bulgaria.

Location
British mapping in 1978.

See also
 List of glaciers in the Antarctic
 Glaciology

Maps
 British Antarctic Territory.  Scale 1:200000 topographic map No. 3197. DOS 610 - W 63 60.  Tolworth, UK, 1978.
Antarctic Digital Database (ADD). Scale 1:250000 topographic map of Antarctica. Scientific Committee on Antarctic Research (SCAR). Since 1993, regularly upgraded and updated.

Notes

References
 Bulgarian Antarctic Gazetteer. Antarctic Place-names Commission. (details in Bulgarian, basic data in English)
 Pastra Glacier. SCAR Composite Gazetteer of Antarctica.

External links
 Pastra Glacier. Copernix satellite image

 

Glaciers of the Palmer Archipelago
Bulgaria and the Antarctic
Trinity Island